The Liberal Country Party (LCP) was a splinter group of the United Country Party, the Victorian branch of the Australian Country Party, formed after federal MP John McEwen was expelled from the state branch for accepting a ministry in the Lyons-Page Coalition government in 1937. Following a tumultuous party conference in 1938, another federal MP, Thomas Paterson, led a hundred McEwen supporters to form the LCP, a faction of the party loyal to the federal party. The breach had been resolved by 1943.

References

Defunct political parties in Victoria (Australia)
National Party of Australia
Political parties established in 1938
Political parties disestablished in 1943
1938 establishments in Australia
1943 disestablishments in Australia